The Northrop Grumman B-21 Raider is an American strategic bomber under development for the United States Air Force (USAF) by Northrop Grumman. As part of the Long Range Strike Bomber (LRS-B) program, it is to be a long-range, stealth intercontinental strategic bomber for the USAF, able to deliver conventional and thermonuclear weapons. The Air Force intends the B-21 to replace the Rockwell B-1 Lancer and Northrop Grumman B-2 Spirit by 2040, and possibly the Boeing B-52 Stratofortress after that.

The Air Force began planning for the B-21 in 2011 and awarded the major development contract in 2015. The B-21 is expected to make its first flight in 2023 and enter service by 2027.

Many aspects of the B-21 program are highly classified; the program is designated as a special access program. The Congressional Research Service noted in 2021 that the B-21's technical details and specifications, such as speed, enabling systems, "size, required stealth, structure, number and type of engines, projected weapons, and onboard sensors remain classified" although some information about various other aspects of the program have been made public since 2015. The first photos of the aircraft were released on 2 December 2022, taken during a rollout ceremony at Northrop Grumman's production facilities in Palmdale, California.

Design and development

The classified Long Range Strike Bomber (LRS-B) program began in 2011, and the Air Force issued a request for proposal to develop a LRS-B aircraft in July 2014. A development contract was awarded to Northrop Grumman in October 2015. Boeing and Lockheed Martin, who submitted losing bids for the project, filed bid protests; in October 2016, the Government Accountability Office (GAO) rejected the challenges and sustained the USAF's decision to award the LRS-B contract to Northrop Grumman. The GAO report revealed that cost was the deciding factor in selecting Northrop Grumman over the Boeing-Lockheed Martin team.

Management and acquisition of the B-21 program is being overseen by the Air Force Rapid Capabilities Office, rather than through the traditional military-procurement process. However, the B-21 program remains subject to the Nunn–McCurdy reporting requirements to Congress.

A 2015 media report said the Air Force wanted the bomber to also function as an intelligence collection platform, battle manager, and interceptor aircraft. In 2016, then–Secretary of the Air Force Deborah Lee James said that the B-21 would be a "fifth-generation global precision attack platform" with networked sensor-shoot capability. Northrop Grumman describes the B-21 as "the world's first sixth-generation aircraft."

At the 2016 Air Warfare Symposium, Air Force officials announced that the LRS-B would be formally designated "B-21" because the aircraft would be the 21st century's first bomber. In September 2016, Air Force officials announced that the B-21 would be named "Raider" in honor of the Doolittle Raiders. Retired Lt. Col. Richard E. Cole, the last living member of the Doolittle Raiders, was present at the naming ceremony at the Air Force Association conference.

In March 2016, the USAF announced seven tier-one suppliers for the program: Pratt & Whitney, BAE Systems, Spirit AeroSystems, Orbital ATK, Rockwell Collins, GKN Aerospace, and Janicki Industries.

In 2016, the F-35 program manager Chris Bogdan said the B-21's engines would be similar enough to the F-35's Pratt & Whitney F135 engine to reduce its cost.

The program completed its critical design review in December 2018.

In January 2020, Air Force officials released new B-21 renderings and Northrop Grumman, showing the distinctive flush and blended inlets and the two-wheel main landing gear design. The drawing appeared to show a smaller, lighter aircraft than the B-2.In September 2022, the USAF announced that the B-21 was to be unveiled in early December 2022 at Northrop Grumman's production facilities in Palmdale, California. The ceremony took place on 2 December 2022. At the unveiling, Northrop CEO Kathy Warden said that the B-21 is designed with modular, open systems architecture to allow easy upgrades, and potentially, the ability to export components to foreign buyers. Warden said that the B-21's internal operations were "extremely advanced compared to the B-2" and that the B-21 was slightly smaller than the B-2, with a longer range.

Production and assembly 
In February 2016, the head of the Air Force Global Strike Command said he expected the service would place an initial order for 100 B-21s and build up to a full fleet of 175 to 200. In 2017, two USAF studies suggested that Air Force could increase its initial purchase from 80-to-100 to 145 aircraft.

Assembly of the B-21 takes place at the United States Air Force Plant 42 near Palmdale, California, at the same facility Northrop Grumman used during the 1980s and 1990s to build B-2 bombers. 

In January 2017, Northrop Grumman was awarded a $35.8 million contract modification for a large coatings facility at Plant 42, to be completed by the end of 2019; the contract announcement did not specifically mention B-21, but the facility was likely meant for B-21 stealth coating. By the summer of 2019, it was reported that construction of the first aircraft was underway. In early 2021, several media outlets reported that as completion of the first B-21 approached, construction on the second unit had begun. 

At a congressional hearing in June 2021, Darlene Costello, the acting Assistant Secretary of the Air Force Acquisition, Technology & Logistics, confirmed that the first two B-21s were under construction at Plant 42.

By February 2022, six B-21s were under construction. The first B-21 was moved to a calibration facility the following month. About 8,000 Northrop Grumman employees had worked on the program with greater than 400 suppliers from at least 40 different states.

Program costs 
In July 2016, the USAF said it would not release the estimated cost of Northrop's B-21 contract, asserting that the number would reveal too much information about the classified project to potential adversaries. The Senate Armed Services Committee also voted to not publicly release the program's cost, restricting the information to congressional defense committees over the objections of a bipartisan group of legislators led by the committee's chairman, Senator John McCain. McCain's proposed revisions to the National Defense Authorization Act for Fiscal Year 2017 would have reduced authorization for the B-21 program by $302 million "due to a lower than expected contract award value", while requiring "strict...program baseline and cost control thresholds", "quarterly program performance reports", and "disclosure of the engineering and manufacturing development total contract award value". The versions of the 2017 NDAA as initially passed by the House and Senate would have required public disclosure of the total cost of the B-21, but this provision was removed in the final conference report version.

In December 2022, the cost of a B-21 aircraft was estimated to be $700 million; at the time, Air Force officials estimated that they would spend at least $203 billion over 30 years to develop, purchase, and operate a fleet of 100 B-21s.

Maintenance, sustainment, and operation 
Maintenance and sustainment of the B-21 will be coordinated by Tinker Air Force Base, Oklahoma, while Edwards Air Force Base, California, will lead testing and evaluation. The B-21 is expected to operate from bases that currently host heavy bombers, such as Dyess Air Force Base, Texas; Ellsworth Air Force Base, South Dakota; and Whiteman Air Force Base, Missouri. In March 2019, Ellsworth was selected as the base to host the first operational B-21 unit and the first training unit.

Planned role in fleet
The B-21 is slated by 2040 to replace the U.S. Air Force's 63 B-1 strategic bombers, which date from the 1980s, and 20 B-2 strategic bombers, which date from the 1990s. The B-21 may also eventually replace the B-52, which is slated to remain in service for many decades.Dan Lamothe, Pentagon reveals secretive B-21 bomber in California, Washington Post (December 2, 2022): "The Pentagon intends for the Raider to replace aging B-2 Spirit and B-1B Lancer bombers, phasing out the older aircraft by the 2040s. B-52 bombers, many decades old, also could be replaced by the B-21 in coming years."

Potential related projects

In March 2022, Air Force Secretary Frank Kendall III raised the possibility of a bomber drone to work with the bomber, but the idea was later dropped because it would not save much money to produce such a large unmanned aircraft.

The USAF is also planning to acquire a new long-range fighter from its Next Generation Air Dominance program, known as the F-X or "Penetrating Counter-Air", to escort the B-21 deep into enemy territory and help it survive enemy air defenses and intercepting fighters.

Possible Australian interest
In December 2022, an Australian Strategic Policy Institute report advocated the acquisition of a number of B-21 Raiders in order to enable Australia to have a greater long-range strike capability.

The report states that a B-21 could fly  without refuelling while carrying more munitions as compared to the maximum  range of the RAAF's F-35 fighter jets, which require air-to-air refuelling. A single B-21 can also deliver the same impact as several F-35As. Additionally, the B-21 can attack targets from secure air bases located in Australia's south, with greater proximity to more personnel, fuel and munitions.

During bilateral talks held in August 2022, it was reported that the US might allow Australia to procure the B-21. When asked if the US would consider allowing Australia to join in developing the B-21 bomber, Air Force Secretary Frank Kendall stated that "I don't think that there's any fundamental limitation on the areas in which we can cooperate, If Australia had a requirement for long-range strike then we'd be willing to have a conversation with them about that."

See also

Notes and References

External links

 Official B-21 Raider webpage from Northrop Grumman
 Official B-21 Raider fact sheet from the U.S. Air Force

B-21 Raider
Proposed military aircraft of the United States
Flying wings
Stealth aircraft
United States bomber aircraft
Strategic bombers
2020s United States military aircraft